Somerset was a parliamentary constituency in Somerset, which returned two Members of Parliament (MPs), known traditionally as knights of the shire, to the House of Commons of England until 1707, the House of Commons of Great Britain from 1707 to 1800, and the House of Commons of the United Kingdom from 1801 to 1832.

Elections were held by the bloc vote system.

Members of Parliament

MPs 1290–1629

 Constituency created (1290)

{| class="wikitable"
|-
!Parliament!!First member!!Second member
|-
|Parliament of 1366
|Hugh de Durborough<ref name=rack>John Collinson, Edmund Rack, 'The History and Antiquities of the County of Somerset: Collected from Authentic Records, and an Actual Survey Made by the Late Mr. Edmund Rack. Adorned with a Map of the County, and Engravings of Roman and Other Reliques, Town-seals, Baths, Churches, and Gentlemen's Seats, Volume 1, R. Cutwell, 1791, p. xxx online </ref>
|William Bonville
|-
|Parliament of 1368
|Hugh de Durborough
|Walter Blewet
|-
|Parliament of 1369
|Edward Cheney
|Matthew de Clevedon
|-
|Parliament of 1371
|John Beauchamp of Lillisdon
|
|-
|Parliament of 1372
|Hugh de Durborough
|John Reynon
|-
|Parliament of 1373
|Sir John Delamare 
|Walter Blewet
|-
|Parliament of 1376
|Thomas Marshall
|
|-
|Parliament of 1377
|Sir John Delamare 
|Sir Thomas Hungerford
|-
|Parliament of 1379
|Sir John Burghersh
|-
|Parliament of 1382
|Sir John Delamare 
|Sir Thomas Hungerford
|-
|Parliament of 1383 (Oct)
|Sir William Bonville
|-
|Parliament of 1384 (Apr)
|Sir William Bonville
|-
|Parliament of 1384 (Nov)
|Sir William Bonville
|-
|Parliament of 1386
|Sir William Bonville
|Sir Thomas Brooke
|-
|First Parliament of 1388
|Sir William Bonville
|Sir Thomas Brooke
|-
|Second Parliament of 1388
|Sir Thomas Hungerford
|Sir John Burghersh
|-
|First Parliament of 1390
|Sir Stephen Derby
|Thomas Beaupine
|-
|Second Parliament of 1390
|Sir John Berkeley
|Sir Thomas Hungerford
|-
|Parliament of 1391
|Sir John Rodney
|Sir Thomas Brooke
|-
|Parliament of 1393
|Sir Thomas Brooke
|Sir William Bonville
|-
|Parliament of 1394
|Sir Humphrey Stafford I
|Sir John Berkeley
|-
|Parliament of 1395
|Sir William Bonville
|Sir Thomas Brooke
|-
|First Parliament of 1397
|Sir Thomas Brooke
|Sir Thomas Arthur
|-
|Second Parliament of 1397
|Sir Ivo Fitzwaryn
|Sir Thomas Brooke
|-
|Parliament of 1399
|Sir Thomas Brooke
|Sir William Bonville
|-
|Parliament of 1401
|Sir Thomas Beauchamp
|William Stourton
|-
|Parliament of 1402
|Sir Thomas Brooke
|William Stourton
|-
|First Parliament of 1404
|Sir Thomas Brooke
|William Stourton
|-
|Second Parliament of 1404
|Sir Hugh Lutrell
|Sir Leonard Hakluyt
|-
|Parliament of 1406
|Sir Walter Rodney
|Sir Leonard Hakluyt
|-
|Parliament of 1407
|Sir Thomas Brooke
|Richard Cheddar
|-
|Parliament of 1410
|Walter Hungerford
|Sir Thomas Brooke
|-
|Second Parliament of 1413
|Sir Thomas Brooke
|Richard Cheddar
|-
|First Parliament of 1414
|Sir John Tiptoft
|Sir Hugh Luttrell
|-
|Second Parliament of 1414
|Sir Hugh Luttrell
|Robert Hill
|-
|Parliament of 1415
|Sir Hugh Luttrell
|Robert Hill
|-
|First Parliament of 1416
|Robert Hill
|Richard Boyton
|-
|Parliament of 1417
|Thomas Brooke
|Richard Cheddar
|-
|Parliament of 1419
|Robert Hill
|John Stourton
|-
|Parliament of 1420
|Sir Thomas Stawell
|John Stourton
|-
|First Parliament of 1421
|Sir William Bonville
|Sir Thomas Brooke
|-
|Second Parliament of 1421
|Richard Cheddar
|John Stourton
|-
|Parliament of 1424
|Giles Daubeney
|
|-
|Parliament of 1429
|Giles Daubeney
|
|-
|Parliament of 1433
|John Hody
|
|-
|Parliament of 1435
|John Hody
|
|-
|Parliament of 1437
|John Hody
|
|-
|Parliament of 1455
|William Courtenay
|
|-
|Parliament of 1529
|Sir Nicholas Wadham
|Sir William Stourton
|-
|Parliament of 1539
|Sir Hugh Paulet
|Sir Thomas Speke
|-
|Parliament of 1545
|Sir Thomas Speke
|Sir John St Loe
|-
|Parliament of 1547
|Sir Maurice Berkeley
|Sir Henry Capell
|-
|First Parliament of 1553
|Sir Ralph Hopton
|Sir Edward Rogers
|-
|Second Parliament of 1553
|Sir Edward Rogers
|Sir Ralph Hopton
|-
|First Parliament of 1554
|Sir Edward Waldegrave
|Sir John Sydenham
|-
|Second Parliament of 1554
|Sir Edward Waldegrave
|Humphrey Colles
|-
|Parliament of 1555
|?Sir Ralph Hopton
|?Sir John St Loe
|-
|Parliament of 1558
|rowspan="3"|Sir Edward Rogers
|John Walshe
|-
|Parliament of 1559
|Sir William St Loe
|-
|Parliament of 1562–1567
|Sir Maurice Berkeley
|-
|Parliament of 1571
|Amias Paulet
|George Rogers
|-
|Parliament of 1572–1581
|Sir Hugh Paulet diedSir George Speke
|Sir Maurice Berkeley
|-
|Parliament of 1584–1585
|rowspan="2"|Thomas Horner
|rowspan="2"|(Sir) Henry Berkeley
|-
|Parliament of 1586–1587
|-
|Parliament of 1588–1589
|rowspan="2"|(Sir) Francis Hastings
|rowspan="2"|Edward Dyer
|-
|Parliament of 1593
|-
|Parliament of 1597–1598
|Sir Francis Popham
|Sir Hugh Portman
|-
|Parliament of 1601
|rowspan="2"|(Sir) Edward Phelips
|Sir Maurice Berkeley
|-
|Parliament of 1604–1611
|rowspan="2"|Sir Francis Hastings died 1610In his place John Poulett
|-
|Addled Parliament (1614)
|Sir Maurice Berkeley
|-
|Parliament of 1621–1622
|Robert Hopton
|Sir Henry Portman died 1621In his place Charles Berkeley
|-
|Happy Parliament (1624–1625)
|rowspan="2"|Sir Robert Phelips
|John Symes
|-
|Useless Parliament (1625) 
|John Stawell
|-
|Parliament of 1625–1626 
|Sir Henry Berkeley
|Sir John Horner
|-
|Parliament of 1628–1629
|Sir Robert Phelips
|Sir Edward Rodney 
|-
|colspan="4"|No Parliament summoned 1629–1640|-
|}

MPs 1640–1832

 References 

 Sources 
D Brunton & D H Pennington, Members of the Long Parliament (London: George Allen & Unwin, 1954)Cobbett's Parliamentary history of England, from the Norman Conquest in 1066 to the year 1803 (London: Thomas Hansard, 1808) 
 
 Henry Stooks Smith, The Parliaments of England from 1715 to 1847'', Volume 2 (London: Simpkin, Marshall & Co, 1845)

Parliamentary constituencies in Somerset (historic)
Constituencies of the Parliament of the United Kingdom established in 1290
Constituencies of the Parliament of the United Kingdom disestablished in 1832